Bajrangi Bhaijaan is a 2015 Indian Hindi-language comedy-drama film co-written and directed by Kabir Khan, based on an original story by screenwriter V. Vijayendra Prasad, and produced by Salman Khan, Rockline Venkatesh and Kabir Khan. The film stars Salman with debutante Harshaali Malhotra, Kareena Kapoor Khan and Nawazuddin Siddiqui, and tells the story of Pawan Kumar Chaturvedi, a devotee of the Hindu deity Hanuman, who embarks on a journey to take a mute six-year-old Pakistani Muslim girl Shahida, separated in India from her mother, back to her hometown.

Made on a budget of – , the principal photography commenced in November 2014. The cinematography was done by Aseem Mishra and was edited by Rameshwar S. Bhagat. Julius Packiam composed the film score while the songs featured in the film were composed by Pritam.

Bajrangi Bhaijaan received widespread critical acclaim from critics upon release, who praised its storyline, dialogues, music, cinematography, direction and the cast performances, particularly those of Salman Khan, Siddiqui and Malhotra, and became a huge commercial success; it grossed  worldwide, and is currently the 5th highest-grossing Indian film and 2nd highest-grossing Bollywood film. It won the National Film Award for Best Popular Film Providing Wholesome Entertainment at the 63rd National Film Awards,  and was nominated for 4 awards at the 61st Filmfare Awards, including Best Film, Best Director (Kabir Khan) and Best Actor (Salman Khan), and won Best Story (V. Vijayendra Prasad). It was also nominated for Best Foreign Film in China's 2015 Douban Film Awards.

In December 2021, Salman Khan announced that a sequel is in development with Prasad set to write.

Plot 

In the hills of Sultanpur, Jhelum, Pakistan lives a six-year-old mute girl named Shahida. One afternoon, she is playing on a hill when she accidentally falls off it. When she doesn’t return home by the end of the day, the villagers organize a search party. After hours of searching, they find the little girl on a branch protruding from the hill. She had been stuck on it for the entire day but couldn’t call for help because of her disability. The following morning, her parents and neighbors discuss what must be done to help her. Older man suggests they take her to the shrine of Sufi saint Nizamuddin Auliya in Delhi, India. The religious family believes that a visit to the holy shrine will bring peace and happiness and most importantly, restore Shahida’s speech. Shahida’s father used to be in the military and has fought against the Indian army. He is sure that he won't be provided with a visa to India. Hence, her mother Razia takes it upon herself to travel far from the village for the first time. The trip goes as planned for the most part. The two reach the shrine, pay offerings and get on a train back to their home country. 

On the return journey, the train stops for repairs at night. When everyone is asleep, Shahida notices a sheep stuck in a pit right outside the train. She doesn’t think much before going outside to help the animal. However, the train restarts before she can return to her mother. The little girl runs towards it but is eventually left behind. In a desperate attempt to go the same way that her mother did, she boards a freight train. But to her dismay, it goes reverse-path and stops in Kurukshetra, India. Raiza notices her daughter is missing and stops the train. Policemen are appointed to look for the girl around the track where she was lost. However, they cannot find her since Shahida has already reached a different place. Raiza meets her husband who is worried to death about his daughter. They cannot get an immediate visa back to India, much to their dismay. The parents have no other way but to pray that their daughter is safe.
 
Meanwhile, Shahida is now lost in a different country with no way to communicate. In a religious celebration, she sees a stranger eating at a street-side restaurant. The stranger is the kind Pawan Kumar Chaturvedi who invites her to have a meal with him. After a few minutes of trying to get her to talk, he realizes she is mute and starts calling her Munni. A starving Munni finishes the food and follows Pawan around. Assuming that she was separated from her parents during the festival, he asks her to stay in front of a temple. Pawan is a devout Hindu Brahmin and an ardent devotee of Lord Hanuman. He believes that Lord Hanuman will take Munni home if she stays in front of his temple. When Munni still doesn’t stop following him, he brings her to the police station. But since she cannot tell them any details about her parents, the police can only wait for someone to file a missing complaint. Until her parents are found, Munni needs a place to stay, hence, Pawan takes her in. On his way to his home in Delhi, he tells Munni to call him Mama if she ever talks in the future. He also starts naming different Indian cities, asking her to nod if she knows what city her parents are in. All the passengers on the bus help him but none of them name cities outside of India. As they talk, Pawan tells everyone how he came to Delhi for work. 

A flashback shows the time he was in high school. He was an average student who could never pass the final examination. All his friends cheated and went on with their lives, but Pawan refused to cheat or lie, being a true  
devotee of Lord Hanuman. Eventually, he passed on his eleventh try and came to Delhi to look for work. He stayed with his father’s friend, Pandey, a strict Hindu who refused to let the followers of any other religion enter his house. Pandey’s daughter Rasika offered Pawan a job at the school she taught and fell in love with his innocent persona. But being the strict father he is, Pandey asked Pawan to build his own house before marrying his daughter. Even since then, Pawan and Rasika have been working hard to collect money. The two are bound to get married sometime next year. Everyone on the bus is impressed by his story. He and Munni reach his home where Rasika receives them in the doorway. She is glad that Pawan is helping a little girl in need but Pandey doesn’t feel the same way. He is worried about the possibility that Munni belongs to a different religion. Pawan rationalizes that she is Hindu because of her fair skin color and persuades Pandey to let her stay for a month. Munni cries every day in the memory of her parents even though Pawan and Rasika treat her like their own daughter. Since the entire family is vegetarian and Munni is accustomed to eating meat with every meal, she hardly ever finishes her food. 

One day, Pawan and Rasika find her in a Muslim neighbor’s home devouring home-cooked chicken. Pawan brings her to a restaurant that evening and lets her eat whatever she likes, even though eating meat is against his religion.  
Munni is very fond of the glittery bangles they sell on the street side. One day while walking down a market, she innocently picks up a pack of bangles before being stopped by the vendor. Pawan makes her return it and takes her to the temple to apologize to God for stealing. As he teaches her to join her hands, Munni sneaks into a Mosque nearby. Pawan is hesitant to follow her inside but he does it anyway. To his utter surprise, he sees her reading the Quran in front of a shrine. For a few minutes, he feels like she betrayed him because he would have never befriended a Muslim.But Rasika makes him realize that she is a human before being Muslim. She hates that her father discriminates against people because of their religion and wants Pawan to be different. Pawan understands and runs into the Mosque to get Munni but by now, she has already left. As he nervously looks for her, she runs to him and hugs him tightly. At that moment, he accepts her entirely, overcoming his irrational fear of going against his religion.  

That night is a cricket match against Pakistan and India. The entire family watches it on TV, cheering for India, except Munni who cheers when Pakistan scores. When the Pakistani team wins the game, she dances and kisses their flag through TV. Pawan approaches her and asks her if she is from Pakistan. After weeks of shaking her head to every Indian city, Munni finally nods yes. Pandey is furious. Being a Muslim was bad enough but since the girl is from Pakistan, he can no longer allow her to stay at their home. Pawan promises to hand her to the Pakistani embassy the next day. However, the embassy worker cannot allow her a visa without a passport. In Munni’s case, they don’t even know her real name so a visa allotment is impossible. Moreover, a riot takes place in front of the embassy that closes all visa processing for a month. As the last resort, Pawan takes her to a travel agent at Pandey’s suggestion. The agent promises to take the little girl to the other side of the border and asks for one lakh rupees. Pawan and Rakisa give up the funds they had collected for their house to help Munni. The next day, Pawan reluctantly brings Munni to the travel agent’s office and leaves after a tearful farewell. On his way home, he notices a street vendor selling glittery bangles. He remembers that Munni liked them and buys one for her. However, on returning to the travel agent’s office, he finds out that he has been cheated. The agent has taken the little girl to a brothel and is about to sell her into prostitution. The otherwise composed Pawan loses his temper at the sight of the agent counting bills that he made from Munni. He throws the man out of the window and brings Munni home again. 

Pawan has made the decision to bring Munni home himself. Although he has no connections or ideas about Pakistani villages, he packs his bags and makes his way to the border.  A few miles away from it, they meet a secret agent named Ali who illegally transports people to the other side through a tunnel. After listening to Munni’s story, he agrees to take them for free.  When they reach Pakistan’s side of the border, Ali runs away but being a lord Hanuman’s devotee, Pawan refuses to go without asking the guards for permission. When the officers find him, they beat him up as Munni watches and cries. Pawan pretends to laugh even while being beaten so the little girl wouldn’t be afraid. After finding out the reason for his travel the head soldier asks him to do whatever he wants in the following ten minutes before they return for the next round. Pawan decides to wait for them because they have still not permitted him.  Although the idea is idiotic, and he gets beaten up again, he is eventually allowed to go, with permission from the soldiers.
 
In the following scene, he and Munni are in a restaurant. Munni sees a cop’s handcuffs and steals it, assuming that it is a bracelet.  The cop finds out and throws Pawan in jail, labeling him as an Indian spy because of the lack of a passport. Then, we are introduced to a struggling journalist Chand Nawab. He finds out about the alleged spy and runs to the police station to interview him. He gets a few vague answers from Pawan and informs the media company that doesn’t take him seriously. Inside the police station, a cop interrogates Pawan but refuses to believe anything he has to say. Suddenly, Munni sees a picture on a table calendar and recognizes it as her village. Pawan is overjoyed until the policeman forcefully makes Munni open her mouth. Pawan loses his temper and attacks the man, inviting more trouble for himself. He manages to defeat the officers and run away from the police. Nawab sees him escaping and follows him behind. 

They board the bus where Pawan shows the conductor their destination and also tells him Munni’s story.  After finding out he is actually a good person, Nawab and the rest of the travelers decide to help him. They hide him and Munni on the top of the bus when the police come looking for them. At night, Nawab, Pawan, and Munni stay at a Mosque. A religious scholar named Azad also helps them and hides them from the policemen searching the entire city for the alleged spy. One of Azad’s students sees "Switzerland" written on the picture that Munni thought was her village. The group is back to square one. After that, Azad dresses up Pawan and Nawab in a burqa and manages to send them outside the city without the police noticing. Pawan, who was oblivious to Islam a few weeks ago, feels strange in them traditional clothing. He apologizes to his god but is ready to do anything for Munni. For the next few days, Pawan and Nawab take Munni to several different places, asking people if they know her. Nawab documents their journey and everything about Munni and Pawan’s relationship. He tries selling the documentary to news channels, but they refuse to air it, claiming that it is boring. They have to find another way to spread the news so, the people on the internet can help. One day, they go to a famous mosque were they find policemen looking for them. Nawab realizes that his cameraman friend is being used by the police to gather information about their whereabouts. The trio immediately runs away from the holy place and gives the cameraman false information to distract the police.  

Following that, the group is reviewing the footage from their time at the mosque when Munni recognizes her mother in one of the clips. They see her getting into a specific bus and go to the bus driver the very next day. On inquiring, he names all the villages that come to his daily route. One of them is Sultanpur which Munni confirms is her home. Nawab and Pawan hug, having finally found their destination. Nawab also uploads the video documentary on YouTube and the police get a hint of their location through it. On their way to Sultanpur, the bus is stopped to be checked. With no way out, Pawan comes to the police’s view and pretends to run away. While the men are busy trying to catch him, Nawab takes Munni and brings her back to her village. In the following scene, we see Munni run to her mother, who couldn’t be happier to see her. As she reunites with her family, Pawan gets beaten up by the police. 

The documentary on YouTube goes viral and bigger news channels start covering the story. Eventually, people find out that Pawan is not a spy and is being held in prison for helping a little girl. Both Indian and Pakistani people give him all their support. But the Pakistani officials refuse to let him go. They torture him in prison, beating him up for hours, drowning him until his last breath, and starving him. Nawab then claps back with another video, this time on a bigger platform, asking people to gather at the border and ensure that Pawan reaches home safely. The plan works, and several people from both sides come to the border in crowds. Rasika and her family are also among the crowd, waiting for him to come home. Eventually, the officials have to back down. The crowd erupts chanting Pawan’s name as he crosses the border. Then, we see Munni among the crowd, waving her hands but unable to call him. All of a sudden, she shouts “Mama”, the name Pawan wanted her to call him when they first met. The crowd goes silent as she yells goodbye. Pawan turns around in shock. The movie ends as they run to each other and hug.

Cast 
 Salman Khan as Pawan Kumar Chaturvedi a.k.a Bajrangi Bhaijaan, a Hindu Brahmin hailing from Pratapgarh who has been living in Delhi since his father Diwakar's death
 Najeem Khan as teenage Pawan
 Harshaali Malhotra as Shahida "Munni" Aziz, a mute Pakistani girl who gets lost in India and bumps into Pawan, who makes it his mission to take her back home
 Kareena Kapoor Khan as Rasika Pandey, Dayanand and Archana's daughter and Pawan's love interest and fiancé
 Nawazuddin Siddiqui as Chand Nawab, a Pakistani news reporter and Pawan's later ally, based on a real-life Pakistani reporter with the same name
 Sharat Saxena as Dayanand Pandey, Archana's husband and Rasika's father, Diwakar's childhood friend
 Alka Badola Kaushal as Archana Pandey, Dayanand's wife and Rasika's mother
 Meher Vij as Razia Aziz, Rauf's wife and Shahida's mother who ends up losing her in the train
 Kushaal Pawar as Kamil Yusuf, Chand Nawab's cameraman caught by police to get information about Pawan and Chand Nawab
 Mir Sarwar as Rauf Aziz, Razia's husband and Shahida's father.
 Kamlesh Gill as Farookh Zehrullah, passenger in the train with Razia & Shahida
 Om Puri as Maulana Azad, a religious scholar
 Adnan Sami as a singer in the song  "Bhardo Jholi Meri"
 Rajesh Sharma as Hamid Khan, a Pakistani senior police officer
 Krunal Pandit as Vardhan, travel agent in Delhi
 Mursaleen Qureshi as Boosmaan "Boo" Ali, smuggler at India-Pakistan's border who helps Pawan and Munni to cross the border illegally
 Manoj Bakshi as Police Inspector Iqbal Qureshi
 Harssh A. Singh as Shamsher Ali, Pakistani news channel head and Chand Nawab's boss
 Yudhvir Dahiya as Pankaj Verma, reporter of NDTV
 Atul Srivastava as Diwakar Prasad Chaturvedi, Pawan's father and Dayanand's childhood friend, who chided Pawan for his failures

Production

Development 
The film's story writer V. Vijayendra Prasad stated that the idea of the film was inspired by the 1987 Telugu film Pasivadi Pranam, which itself is a remake of the  Malayalam film Poovinu Puthiya Poonthennal (1986). Prasad also took inspiration from a story he heard about a Pakistani couple coming to India for their daughter's heart surgery.

Kabir Khan noted that the script of Bajrangi Bhaijaan was influenced by some of his own experiences. He noted the influence of the Hindu epic Ramayana, which he used to watch Ramlila plays of as a child, and particularly the Hindu deity Bajrangi (Hanuman), who left a strong impression on him as a child. He felt that Bajrangi was a character who was loved by people all religious communities in India, including Hindus and Muslims in India, due to how Bajrangi brought joy and fun to many Indian children. Khan began writing Bajrangi Bhaijaan partly in response to the rise of religious sectarianism in India since the 1980s and particularly in response to the Bajrang Dal, a Hindu fundamentalist organisation that appropriated Bajrangi for violent sectarian motives and played a central role in the deadly 2002 Gujarat riots, leading to the name Bajrangi having communal connotations. He began writing Bajrangi Bhaijaan in 2013 as a way of reclaiming Bajrangi for all communities, and as a way of bringing Hindus and Muslims together.

The film's casting director was Mukesh Chhabra.

Principal photography 
The principal photography began on 3 November 2014 in New Delhi, with Salman Khan and Kareena Kapoor Khan participating. The second filming schedule took place at the ND Studios, Karjat. The third schedule of the film was held in Mandawa, Rajasthan. On 7 January 2015, Khan was seen on the top of the castle of Mandawa playing cricket with a young boy. On 10 January 2015, Khan shot with school students in Rajasthan's Jhunjhunu district. Shooting of the film was completed on 20 May. Some scenes of the film were shot at Khan's Panvel farm house. Shooting also took place in the Kashmir Valley in places like Sonamarg and Zoji La. The film's climax was shot at Sonmarg near the Thajiwas glacier (at 10,000 ft above sea level) with around 7,000 people. Nawazuddin Siddiqui's character Chand Nawab was inspired by a real character Chand Nawab, who was with Karachi-based Indus News in 2008.

Music 

A. R. Rahman was initially in talks to compose the music of the film, however he did not sign the film. The music was then composed by Kabir Khan's usual collaborators, with Pritam composing the songs and Julius Packiam composing the score. The lyrics were written by Mayur Puri, Amitabh Bhattacharya, Neelesh Misra, Shabbir Ahmed, and Kausar Munir while Julius Packiam composed the score. The soundtrack of the movie become Super Hit. The Song "Bhar Do Jholi" one of the biggest hits of 2015 sang by Adnan Sami. The soundtrack album consists of eleven tracks, was released on 17 June 2015. "Tu Chahiye" and "Selfie Le Le Re" become chartbusters.

The film includes the qawwali "Bhar Do Jholi Meri Ya Muhammad" originally written by Purnam Allahabadi and composed and sung by the Sabri Brothers. The qawwali was revamped with the voice of Adnan Sami Khan. EMI Pakistan and Amjad Sabri heir to the Sabri Brothers, have called for legal action against the producers of the film and the qawwali in separate instances.

Track listing

Release 
Initially announced as an Eid 2014 release, the film was rescheduled to 12 January 2014.Bajrangi Bhaijaan was released on 17 July 2015, one day before Eid, on 4,500 screens in India and 1,000 screens in overseas respectively. The film was also released in 50 countries outside India, on more than 700 screens. Bajrangi Bhaijaan premiered at the 20th Busan International Film Festival (BIFF) on 6 October 2015.

In November 2017, it was announced that Bajrangi Bhaijaan was set to release in China, following the success of Aamir Khan's Dangal (2016) in the country. In December 2017, it was announced the film would release there in 2018. Prior to the announcement, Bajrangi Bhaijaan had a cult following in China, where it has an average rating of 8.6 out of 10 on the popular film site Douban, with over 70,000 votes. It placed fourth on Douban's list of top foreign films of 2015. Bajrangi Bhaijaan was released in China under the title 小萝莉的猴神大叔 which roughly translates as "Little Lolita's Monkey God Uncle"; "monkey god" is a rough translation of "Bajrangi" while "little lolita" and "uncle" reference the characters. The Chinese version was also cut down in length to 140 minutes. In January 2018, it was announced that the film would be getting a wide release, on 8,000 screens in China, building on the Chinese box office success of Aamir Khan's Dangal and Secret Superstar (2017), and Bajrangi Bhaijaans positive word-of-mouth. The film released in China on 2 March 2018. On 6 February 2018, the film had advance screenings in 29 Chinese cities, receiving a positive reception from audiences. It also had a limited preview on 25 February 2018. The film's China premiere on 27 February 2018 was attended by Kabir Khan and Harshali Malhotra. Its release date of 2 March 2018 marks the Lantern Festival, which celebrates families coming together.

It was released in Turkey on 17 August 2018 on 190 screens. In the first weekend it grossed approx $89,796 with a spectator count of 8,389. The film released in Japan on 18 January 2019, with the title "バジュランギおじさんと、小さな迷子", which translates as "Uncle Bajrangi and a small lost child" (Bajurangi ojisan to, chīsana maigo).

Reception 

In India, Bollywood Hungama gave the film 4.5 out of 5 stars, writing that "this film easily qualifies to be Salman Khan's best movie till date, featuring his career's best performance. The film wins you over completely". Srijana Mitra Das of Times of India gave the film 4 out of 5 stars, writing that "Bajrangi Bhaijaan is Salman Khan's most daring film where Salman presents a beautiful performance - but allows the story to be the real "dabangg" ".Rachit Gupta for Filmfare wrote that "If movies are meant to inspire, then Bajrangi Bhaijaan fulfills its purpose with resounding success", giving the movie 3.5 out of 5 stars. Archita Kashyap of Koimoi gave the film 3.5 out of 5 stars, writing that "watch (the film) for full-blown, larger than life, wholesome Hindi filmy entertainment". Raja Sen of Rediff.com gave a 3.5 out of 5 star rating explaining that "Bajrangi Bhaijaan is an overearnest, oversimplified, preposterously sweet and frequently schlocky film, which shouldn't work because of how predictable and soppy it is. Yet, because of a finely picked supporting cast, some sharp lines of dialogue and, most crucially, because of its overall heart, it works, and works well." Rajeev Masand of CNN-IBN gave 3 stars out of 5, commenting "Bajrangi Bhaijaan is way too long at 2 hours and 35 minutes, and could have done with some serious pruning, especially in its first half. Nevertheless, it's more engaging than such typical Salman Khan blockbusters as Bodyguard and Ready, if only because it has a sliver of a story, and its heart in the right place." Anupama Chopra of Hindustan Times said "Bajrangi Bhaijaan is simplistic, occasionally silly, and tiringly over-stretched. It's also unashamedly manipulative. But it works. Director and co-writer Kabir Khan preserves the larger-than-life Salman image but also allows it to evolve so that the star is not just a slick superman." Uday Bhatia for Mint wrote: "To say Bajrangi Bhaijaan is geared towards maximum emotional impact is an understatement. It is engineered for it. Its parts have been carefully assembled so as to make you laugh every other scene, tear up every 10 minutes"; further praising Harshaali Malhotra, he goes "Who says you need a girl and a gun to make a movie? This film proves that you only need the former, provided she’s a criminally cute six-year-old".

Overseas too, the film received positive reviews from Chinese critics. Several critics in China, where it was released as Little Lolita's Monkey Uncle, noted narrative parallels to the 16th century Chinese epic Journey to the West and its monkey-king hero Sun Wukong (which in turn have similarities to the 4th century BC Hindu epic Ramayana and its monkey-god hero Hanuman), making the film relatable to Chinese audiences. The film's theme of connecting people across nations, religions and ethnicities also resonated with Chinese audiences. In Japan, upon release in January 2019, it was the week's highest-rated film on the Filmarks audience satisfaction survey. The core plot of the movie was reported to be thematically similar to the 2006 Kannada movie Kallarali Hoovagi.

Box office 

Bajrangi Bhaijaan grossed  worldwide in its first week, beating the previous record of  worldwide by PK. Bajrangi Bhaijaan became the quickest film to collect  and  net domestically beating PK and Dhoom 3. The distributor share of the film had crossed  crore which is a record in India being the second film to do so after PK. In August 2015, Eros International said in a statement to the Bombay Stock Exchange that Bajrangi Bhaijaan has become the fastest Bollywood film to gross  worldwide, while it crossed  at the domestic box office.

The film is the highest nett grosser ever in Delhi / UP, CP Berar, CI, Bihar, Assam and Orissa, East Punjab, Rajasthan and West Bengal beating the lifetime collections of PK and Dhoom 3. The footfalls of the film crossed 35.2million after five weeks, making it the most watched film in India since Gadar: Ek Prem Katha (2001) and beating PK, 3 Idiots, Dhoom 3, and Kabhi Khushi Kabhie Gham.... Bajrangi Bhaijaan grossed  worldwide at the end of its 7th week. It was one of the highest-grossing Indian film ever at the time, behind PK. Prior to its China release, Bajrangi Bhaijaans worldwide gross was 626crore (US$million) as of 27 February 2018. After 22 days at the Chinese box office, it became the fourth Indian film to gross 900crore (US$million) worldwide, after Dangal, Baahubali 2, and Secret Superstar. As of today, Bajrangi Bhaijaan is the sixth highest-grossing Indian film ever worldwide. The film was marketed by a Mumbai-based company named Spice PR owned by Prabhat Choudhary.

India 
Bajrangi Bhaijaan opened to an overwhelming response at the domestic box office and went on to break the first week record of PK and Happy New Year.

The film grossed  on its second Friday.

Bajrangi Bhaijaan set a new all-time lifetime record in India by becoming the highest grosser ever in Bihar as it went to the  gross mark after its third weekend.

The film grossed  in its fourth weekend. The film collected  in its ninth week becoming the second film ever to gross more than 10 lakhs in the ninth week after Vicky Donor.

The film had a tenth week and became the third Indian film of the 2010s to ever have one. The other films were Vicky Donor and Band Baaja Baaraat.

Overseas 
Bajrangi Bhaijaan grossed around $8.1 million in the first weekend in overseas markets, which is the second-highest opening weekend for a Hindi film. The film has grossed around $2.45 million in its first weekend in US-Canada. Bajrangi Bhaijaan grossed  in Pakistan in its first 3 days of its release, and subsequently  in the first week. At the end of two weeks, Bajrangi Bhaijaan grossed US$20 million in overseas. Bajrangi Bhaijaan grossed around $23.5 million in overseas in 17 days. The film is also the biggest Salman Khan film in the Persian Gulf, beating the previous best of Kick which grossed around $4.1 million. The film has done excellent across all overseas markets, according to Box Office India.

The film topped all four major markets by beating the lifetime collection of PK. Bajrangi Bhaijaan grossed £2,662,115 in the United Kingdom, where it became the highest-grossing foreign-language film of 2015, the eleventh highest-grossing foreign-language film of all time, and the second highest-grossing foreign-language Indian film ever (after Dhoom 3). It also grossed US$9,450,000 in the Persian Gulf region and A$1,701,000 in Australia. The film grossed $8,180,000 after its sixth weekend in the United States and Canada, with a final gross of US$8.187million in the US and Canada. In Hong Kong, the film grossed HK$1,364,088 (US$) in 2016. Bajrangi Bhaijaan grossed US$30.9 million (211 crore) overseas as of 2017. After 26 days of its release in China, the film became the third Indian film (first featuring Salman Khan) to gross more than 500 crore from overseas markets.

China 
In China, on its opening day of 2 March 2018, the film grossed US$2.29million, debuting at number seven on the daily China box office. This is the fourth-highest opening for an Indian film in China, after Secret Superstar ($6.97million), Hindi Medium ($3.68million) and Dangal ($2.55million), while Bajrangi Bhaijaan also crossed the lifetime China gross of 3 Idiots (2009). On its second day, Bajrangi Bhaijaan grossed $3.11million, entering the top five, with a two-day gross of $5.36million. It grossed another $3.13million in its third day, giving it an opening weekend gross of $9million. It is the third-highest opening weekend for an Indian film, behind only Secret Superstar and Dangal, and it has become the highest-grossing Indian film not starring Aamir Khan. The successful opening weekend of Bajrangi Bhaijaan has been attributed to strong word of mouth, generated by high audience ratings such as 8.6 on Douban and 9.7 on Maoyan.

On the 14th day of its release, the film grossed $1.13 million and became the first Indian film not featuring Aamir Khan to gross more than 200crore in the Chinese market, grossing $31.12million up until then. In 31 days, the film had a cumulative gross of  $48million(313crore). The film's audiences were about 60% female and 40% male, and the majority were in the 20–34 age group. It surpassed Star Wars: The Last Jedi to become the seventh highest-grossing film in China during the first quarter of 2018, behind Secret Superstar and other American films including Black Panther and Pacific Rim: Uprising.

Accolades

Sequel 
Later that month, Khan confirmed that the movie has been titled as Pawan Putra Bhaijaan.
Khan also officially announced the same on 19 December 2021 on The Grand RRR pre-release event.

See also 
 Bollywood 100 Crore Club
 List of highest-grossing Bollywood films
 List of Bollywood highest-grossing films in overseas markets

Notes

References

External links 
 
 
 
 

2015 films
2010s Hindi-language films
2010s drama road movies
India–Pakistan relations in popular culture
Films set in Pakistan
Films shot in Delhi
Films shot in Rajasthan
Films shot in Jammu and Kashmir
Films featuring songs by Pritam
Indian comedy-drama films
Indian adventure drama films
Films set in Delhi
Best Popular Film Providing Wholesome Entertainment National Film Award winners
Films shot in Mandawa
Indian drama road movies
Films produced by Salman Khan
Indian musical comedy-drama films
Military of Pakistan in films
Films directed by Kabir Khan
2015 drama films
Rockline Entertainments films